William Henry Steeves (May 20, 1814 – December 9, 1873) was a merchant, lumberman, politician and Father of Canadian Confederation.

Life and career
Born and raised in Hillsborough, New Brunswick, William Henry Steeves was a descendant of Heinrich Stief, founder of the Steeves family in North America, and Regina Stahlecker.

Steeves was educated in public school and began his career running a small store before becoming a partner in Steeves Brothers, a family mercantile and lumber exporting business. Steeves moved to Saint John, New Brunswick in order to further the business and became a leader in the city's financial community. There he married his second cousin, Mary. The date of the wedding is unknown.

Steeves was elected to New Brunswick's colonial House of Assembly in 1846 and was an advocate of governmental reform and the election of all members of the Legislative Council. He was appointed to the Legislative Council (the upper house) in 1851. In 1854, the compact government that had ruled the colony was finally defeated by a reform administration and Steeves became Surveyor General in the new government. He resigned the appointment later that year due to opposition to an unelected person from the Legislative Council being appointed rather than an elected member of the House of Assembly.

In 1855, Steeves became the first chairman of the Department of Public Works. He left government in 1856 when the reform administration of Samuel Leonard Tilley was defeated over prohibition, but he returned to office with Tilley in 1857 and remained commissioner of public works until 1861. He continued in Tilley's government as minister without portfolio until  1865 when the government fell due to its support for Canadian Confederation.

Steeves was a supporter of Confederation and was one of New Brunswick's delegates to the Charlottetown Conference and the Quebec Conference of 1864. He was appointed to the Senate of Canada as a Liberal, when the chamber was created in 1867. In that body, he acted as an advocate for the better care of the mentally ill. The circumstances of his death are not known, but he served in the Senate until his death in 1873. He is interred in the Fernhill Cemetery in Saint John, New Brunswick.

Steeves was a maternal great-grand-uncle of the late Leader of the Opposition and New Democratic Party leader Jack Layton and is the maternal great-great-grand uncle of Toronto City Councillor Mike Layton.

See also 

 Layton family

References

External links 
Biography at the Dictionary of Canadian Biography Online
 
Steeves Museum

1814 births
1873 deaths
Members of the Legislative Assembly of New Brunswick
Canadian senators from New Brunswick
Fathers of Confederation
Liberal Party of Canada senators
People from Albert County, New Brunswick
Persons of National Historic Significance (Canada)
Canadian people of German descent
William Steeves
Colony of New Brunswick people